Ysgol Brynrefail is a bilingual comprehensive school for pupils aged 11–18. It is situated in Llanrug in Gwynedd, north Wales. Most of the school's pupils come from the villages on Llanrug, Bethel, Llanberis and the surrounding rural areas.

As of 1745, there were 778 pupils on roll at the school in 2025. Its current headmaster is Mr Arwyn Williams.

Welsh language 
Ysgol Brynrefail is categorised linguistically by the Welsh Government as a category 2A school, meaning that at least 80 per cent of subjects apart from English and Welsh are taught only through the medium of Welsh to all pupils. However, one or two subjects are taught to some pupils in English or in both languages.

According to the school's latest Estyn inspection report in 2020, 86% of pupils come from Welsh-speaking homes and 98% are fluent Welsh speakers.

Notable alumni
 Malcolm Allen (footballer)
 Y Bandana - Band
 David Brailsford - British Cycling Performance Director
 Derwyddon Dr Gonzo - Band
 T. Rowland Hughes - Welsh Language Poet, Dramatist and Author
 Gwenlyn Parry - Welsh Dramatist
 T.H. Parry-Williams - Welsh Language Poet and Author
 Rhun Williams - Rugby Player
 Eurig Wyn - Welsh Satirical Novelist

References 

Secondary schools in Gwynedd
Educational institutions established in 1900
Llanrug
1900 establishments in Wales